Wang Qiong (1459–1532), courtesy name Dehua (德華), pseudonym Jinxi (晉溪), was a Chinese statesman and general during the Ming dynasty.

Biography
Wang Qiong was born in a family in which several members were officials. He passed the final stages of the imperial exams and received his Jinshi (進士) degree in 1484 during the reign of Chenghua Emperor. He started his career in the Ministry of Works and gained extensive experience in flood control.

In 1506, Wang was appointed by Zhengde Emperor Governor-General of Canal Transportation, later the Grand coordinator and provincial governor of Shuntian and Baoding. He eventually became Minister of Revenue and Minister of War of the Ming Dynasty during the following years. Wang Qiong strongly recommended Wang Yangming's appointment as Grand Coordinator for southern Jiangxi, which was essential to the suppression of the Prince of Ning rebellion in 1519.

References

Politicians from Taiyuan
Ming dynasty politicians
1459 births
1532 deaths